The Amazing Race 25 is the twenty-fifth season of the American reality television show The Amazing Race. It featured eleven teams of two competing in a race around the world.

The season premiered on CBS on September 26, 2014, with the season finale airing on December 19, 2014.

Food scientists Amy DeJong and Maya Warren were the winners of this season, while married dentists Jim and Misti Raman finished in second place, and married surfers Adam Dirks and Bethany Hamilton finished in third.

Production

Development and filming

Filming began in the early morning of May 31, 2014, at Times Square in New York City. CBS invited fans to appear at the starting line to see the teams off. The publicity of the Times Square start led CBS to announce the identities of the competing teams the same day. It was revealed at the public start that instead of the Express Pass, teams would be awarded a new immunity from elimination pass called The Save for finishing first in the first leg. It could be used by that team if they were to finish last on any elimination leg before Leg 9. The Save was presented once in a non-elimination leg so it was never used.

This season spanned  through eight countries, including first time visits to the U.S. Virgin Islands, Malta, and the Shetland Islands of Scotland.

At various points throughout the filming of the season, teams encountered host Phil Keoghan on the course where he explained a task to the home audience while the competition continued behind him.

For the first time in The Amazing Race history, four teams competed in the season's final leg. However, Phil eliminated one team in the middle of the final leg, leaving only three teams racing to the finish line.

Cast

The cast included married professional surfers Bethany Hamilton, a shark attack survivor whose story was told in her memoirs and the film Soul Surfer, and Adam Dirks; former Survivor: South Pacific contestants and engaged couple Whitney Duncan and Keith Tollefson; and TNA Wrestling stars Brooke Adams and Robbie Strauss.

Future appearances
In 2017, Brooke Adams appeared on the second season of the TLC reality show Rattled. In 2019, Robbie Strauss competed on the second episode of The Titan Games.

Results
The following teams are listed with their placements in each leg. Placements are listed in finishing order. 
A  placement with a dagger indicates that the team was eliminated. 
An  placement with a double-dagger indicates that the team was the last to arrive at a pit stop in a non-elimination leg, and had to perform a Speed Bump task in the following leg. 
An italicized and underlined placement indicates that the team was the last to arrive at a pit stop, but there was no rest period at the pit stop and all teams were instructed to continue racing. There was no required Speed Bump task in the next leg.
A  indicates that the team won the Fast Forward. 
 A  indicates that the team used an Express Pass on that leg to bypass one of their tasks.
A  indicates that the team used the U-Turn and a  indicates the team on the receiving end of the U-Turn.

Notes

Race summary

Leg 1 (United States → United States Virgin Islands)

Episode 1: "Go Big or Go Home" (September 26, 2014)
Prize: The Save (awarded to Misti & Jim)
Eliminated: Lisa & Michelle
Locations
New York City, New York (Times Square – Duffy Square) (Starting Line)
New York City (Flushing Meadows–Corona Park – Unisphere)
 New York City → Charlotte Amalie, United States Virgin Islands
Charlotte Amalie (Vendor's Plaza)
 Charlotte Amalie → Lovango Cay
 Lovango Cay → Carval Rock
 Carval Rock → Hans Lollik Island (Blackbeard's Revenge)
 Hans Lollik Island (Beach) 
 Hans Lollik Island (Beach) → Enighed
Charlotte Amalie (Fort Christian) 
Episode summary
At Duffy Square, teams were told to travel to the location of the finish line from the first season of The Amazing Race, which they had to figure out was the Unisphere at Flushing Meadows–Corona Park. There, they found their next clue, which instructed them to fly to the island of Saint Thomas in the U.S. Virgin Islands. At John F. Kennedy International Airport, teams had to book one of two flights to Saint Thomas. The first five teams were booked on the first flight via American Airlines, while the last six teams departed forty minutes later via Delta Air Lines.
Once in Saint Thomas, teams had to make their way to Vendor's Plaza in Charlotte Amalie, where they had to sign up for one of six chartered seaplane flights to Lovango Cay. At Lovango Cay, teams took boats out to Carval Rock, where they had to climb up and along its length. At the end of the islet, teams jumped into the Caribbean Sea and then swam to a series of floating bottles that held their next clue.
Teams then traveled by boat to Hans Lollik Island, where they boarded Blackbeard's Revenge. Teams were greeted by a Blackbeard impersonator, who gave them their next clue directing them to pull themselves to shore in a rowboat.
 In this season's first Roadblock, one team member had to start from one of four landmarks on the beach and use a traditional liquid compass, a shovel, and a unique set of directions to search the beach for a treasure chest buried in the sand that held their next clue.
After completing the Roadblock, teams had to return by boat to Saint Thomas and then check in at the pit stop: Fort Christian in Charlotte Amalie.
Additional notes
Keith, Scott, and Lisa chose to quit the Roadblock. Keith & Whitney and Michael & Scott were issued four-hour penalties that were applied at the start of the next leg, while Lisa & Michelle were the last team to arrive and were therefore eliminated.
Frank Mesa, who had competed in season 1, appeared at the starting line, where he directed teams to the Unisphere when they asked the audience for help in finding the location of their next clue.

Leg 2 (United States Virgin Islands → England)

Episode 2: "When You Gotta Go, You Gotta Go" (October 3, 2014)
Prize: A trip for two to Jukkasjärvi, Sweden (awarded to Adam & Bethany)
Eliminated: Dennis & Isabelle
Locations
Charlotte Amalie (Fort Christian) 
 Charlotte Amalie → London, England
London (Tower Bridge)
London (Somerset House  Victoria Tower Gardens) 
 London → Oxford
Oxford (Magdalen Bridge –  Boathouse)
Oxford (Christ Church College – Tom Quad)
Oxford (Bear Inn) 
Woodstock (Blenheim Palace) 
Episode summary
At the beginning of this leg, teams were instructed to fly to London, England. Teams were booked on two flights to London, with the first six teams on the first flight and the remaining four teams on the second flight. Once in London, teams had to go to Tower Bridge and search for the Pearly King and Queen, who gave them their next clue.
 This season's first Detour was a choice between About Face or Pancake Race. In About Face, teams traveled to Somerset House, where they dressed as members of the Queen's Guard and had to perform the complex steps of the Changing of the Guard ceremony to the satisfaction of the parade commander in order to receive their next clue. In Pancake Race, teams traveled to the Victoria Tower Gardens, where they participated in a recreation of the annual Parliamentary Pancake Race. Each teammate had to dress as a chef, cook a pancake, and then complete one lap around the course, while constantly flipping their pancakes within 1:15 minutes, in order to receive their next clue. If either teammate dropped the pancake, ran out of time, or were judged to not be flipping the pancake enough, both team members had to start over, cooking new pancakes before being allowed to race again.
After completing the Detour, teams were instructed to travel by train to Oxford. There, teams had to punt themselves along the River Cherwell, with one team member standing on the short deck on the punt's stern, propelling it through the water, and the other standing on the punt's bow, one lap around Magdalen College Island in order to receive their next clue.
At Christ Church College, racers were each given a bowler hat and an umbrella that they had to carry for the rest of the leg. Their previous clue had informed them to tip their bowlers, which revealed "Churchill's Birthplace" printed on the inside, which they had to figure out was Blenheim Palace.
 The clue also instructed teams to open their umbrellas for a chance at finding the Express Pass by searching for the oldest pub in Oxford (the Bear Inn) rather than heading directly to the pit stop at Blenheim Palace. Adam & Bethany obtained the Express Pass.

Leg 3 (England → Scotland)

Episode 3: "Get Your Sheep Together" (October 10, 2014)
Prize: A trip for two to Dubai, United Arab Emirates (awarded to Misti & Jim)
Eliminated: Michael & Scott
Locations
Oxford (Walton Street – Oxford University Press) 
 Oxford → Aberdeen, Scotland
Aberdeen (Union Square Parking Area)
 Aberdeen → Lerwick
Lerwick (Royal National Lifeboat Station)
Scalloway (Scalloway Castle)
Scalloway (Peats of Scalloway)  Lerwick (DITT Store, Up Helly Aa Galley Shed & Hay's Dock) 
Scalloway (Berry Farm)
St Ninian's Isle (Tombolo) 
Episode summary
At the beginning of this leg, teams were instructed to travel by train to Aberdeen, Scotland, and then by ferry to the Shetland Islands. After docking, teams had to drive themselves to the Royal National Lifeboat Station and search for a puffin mascot, who gave them their next clue. Teams then traveled to Scalloway Castle, where they had to search the castle grounds for a knight and a Scottish Deerhound guarding a room that held their next clue.
 This leg's Detour was a choice between Pony Up or Light My Fire. In Pony Up, teams traveled to the Peats of Scalloway, where they had to cut fifty blocks of peat from a peat bank using a special spade called a tusker. They then had to load up a Shetland pony with two loads of peat, which they had to deliver up the hill to a farmer, who gave them their next clue once both trips were finished. In Light My Fire, teams participated in an Up Helly Aa: building a traditional viking torch. After performing each step of the torch-making process, they had to have their work approved by a judge before moving onto the next step. Once finished, teams traveled to Hay's Dock, where they presented the torch to the guizer jarl, who lit their torch and then awarded them their next clue.
After completing the Detour, teams had to make their way to Berry Farm, where they had to shepherd a flock of sheep through an obstacle course in order to receive their next clue. Once finished, the shepherd gave teams a Celtic brooch and instructed them to travel to where it was originally found. Teams had to figure out that the brooch was part of an 8th-century treasure horde from St Ninian's Isle, a small islet connected to Shetland via tombolo, where teams checked in at the pit stop.

Leg 4 (Scotland → Denmark & Sweden)

Episode 4: "Thinly Sliced Anchovies" (October 17, 2014)
Prize: A Ford C-Max Hybrid for each team member (awarded to Kym & Alli)
Locations
St Ninian's Isle (Tombolo) 
 Lerwick → Aberdeen
 Aberdeen → Copenhagen, Denmark
Malmö, Sweden (Stortorget )
Copenhagen, Denmark (Sankt Jørgens Allé  Det Franske Conditori Bakery & Allegade 10 Restaurant) 
Copenhagen (Ida Davidsen) 
Copenhagen (VM Houses) 
Episode summary
At the beginning of this leg, teams had to return by ferry to Aberdeen, and then fly to Copenhagen, Denmark. Once in Copenhagen, teams had to drive across the Øresund Bridge to Malmö, Sweden.
 This leg's Detour was a choice between Parking Space or Wedding Cake. In Parking Space, teams traveled to Sankt Jørgens Allé, where they had to set up one of two types of parklets in a parking spot within 30 minutes so that it matched a photograph in order to receive their next clue. If the time expired before they were finished, teams had to move to a new parking space and start over. In Wedding Cake, teams traveled to the Det Franske Conditori bakery, where they had to put together a traditional wedding cake known as a kransekake. They then had to transport the cake across town using a Bullitt cargo bike to the Allegade 10 restaurant. If the cake was correctly made, the maître d' approved the delivery by signing the team's receipt, which they had to return to the head baker in exchange for their next clue.
 In this leg's Roadblock, one team member had to take a smørrebrød (sandwich) order from two restaurant patrons, remembering the menu number of the two sandwiches that they had each ordered, and then use a menu to memorize the four sandwiches' contents. They then had to relay the order, and if they were correct, they had to deliver the sandwiches to the customers, who gave them their next clue.
Teams had to check in at the pit stop: the VM Houses in Copenhagen.
Additional notes
This was a non-elimination leg.

Leg 5 (Denmark → Morocco)

Episode 5: "Morocc'and Roll" (October 24, 2014)
Prize:  for each team member (awarded to Kym & Alli)
Eliminated: Keith & Whitney
Locations
Copenhagen (VM Houses) 
 Copenhagen → Marrakesh, Morocco
Marrakesh (Jemaa el-Fnaa)
Marrakesh (Le Cadeau Berbère & Riad Monceau) 
Marrakesh (Bab Debbagh Tannery) 
Marrakesh (Ben Youssef Madrasa)
Marrakesh (Bob Magic Music & Jemaa el-Fnaa  Le Paradis du Thée & Palais Gharnata) 
Marrakesh (Le Grand Balcon du Café Glacier) 
Marrakesh (Al Matjar Carpet Shop) 
Episode summary
At the beginning of this leg, teams were instructed to fly to Marrakesh, Morocco. Once in Marrakesh, teams had to make their way to the Jemaa el-Fnaa, where they had to find the food cart garage, bring a food cart to the marketplace, and set up the cart to the satisfaction of the cart owner in order to receive their next clue.
 In this leg's Roadblock, one team member had to go into the tannery, collect three unfinished goat skins, and remove the remaining hairs from the skins. They then had to load three bundles of finished hides onto a bike and deliver them to a nearby cobbler. After getting a receipt, they had to return to the tannery to trade it for their next clue.
 For their Speed Bump, Misti & Jim had to travel to Le Cadeau Berbère, pick up ten Moroccan rugs, and then hang the rugs on a wall outside the Riad Monceau hotel so as to prepare them for sale before they could continue racing.
After completing the Roadblock, teams had to travel to the Ben Youssef Madrasa, where they found their next clue.
 This leg's Detour was a choice between Twirl Time or Tea Time. In Twirl Time, teams had to pick up their Gnawa music costumes and instruments, and receive instruction on how to play them. While one team member played a drum to keep a rhythm, the other had to play the krakebs while using their head to continuously twirl a tassel on their hat for one minute in order to receive their next clue. In Tea Time, teams had to properly serve Moroccan mint tea. After picking up a traditional tea set from Le Paradis du Thée, they then traveled to the Palais Gharnata, where they donned costumes and observed how to properly serve the tea. While one team member held the serving tray with one hand, the other had to ceremonially pour the tea into two cups at once, making sure to lift the kettles to a particular height, in order to receive their next clue.
After completing the Detour, teams had to make their way to the Café Glacier in order to find their next clue directing them to the pit stop: the Al Matjar Carpet Shop in Marrakesh.
Additional notes
 Shelley & Nici chose to use the U-Turn on Keith & Whitney. In an unaired scene, Keith & Whitney chose to use the U-Turn on Amy & Maya; however, they had already passed the U-Turn and were therefore unaffected.

Leg 6 (Morocco)

Episode 6: "I Feel Like I Just Kissed a Goat" (October 31, 2014)
Prize: A trip for two to Iguaçu Falls in Brazil (awarded to Misti & Jim)
Eliminated: Shelley & Nici
Locations
Marrakesh (Al Matjar Carpet Shop) 
Marrakesh (El Massi)
Marrakesh (Koutoubia Mosque)
Amizmiz (Abdessadek Boufoulouss Pottery Stand) 
Oumnass (Oumnasse Casbah) 
Tahannaout (Terres d'Amanar) 
Hajar (Casbah d'If) 
Episode summary
At the beginning of this leg, teams went to El Massi and searched for a marked feed station, where they had to pick up two bags of hay and then deliver them to a horse stable across town. They were then instructed to pick a horse-drawn carriage that would take them back into the center of Marrakesh, being sure to feed their horses an apple upon arriving, before they were given their next clue. Once back in Marrakesh, teams had to drive out to the Abdessadek Boufoulouss pottery stand in Amizmiz and then search for their next clue hidden amongst the pots.
 This leg's Detour was a choice between Camp or Cream. In Camp, teams had to set up a traditional Berber tent to the satisfaction of the judge in order to receive their next clue. In Cream, teams had to milk a goat so as to fill a milk pail. They then had to use a goat skin to churn the goat milk until they made at least  of butter in order to receive their next clue.
 In this leg's Roadblock, one team member had to cross a series of rope-and-plank bridges and zip-lines across a canyon in the Atlas Mountains. Once on the other side of the canyon, they had to put together a wooden puzzle. Once the puzzle was correct, they received their next clue and then joined their partner back on the other side of the canyon.
After the Roadblock, teams received a photo depicting the Casbah d'If, which was the pit stop.

Leg 7 (Morocco → Italy)

Episode 7: "Pretty Fly For a Food Scientist" (November 7, 2014)
Prize: A trip for two to Ocho Rios, Jamaica (awarded to Misti & Jim)
Locations
Hajar (Casbah d'If) 
 Marrakesh → Palermo, Italy
Palermo (Teatro di Verdura )
Palermo (Villa Costanza) 
Palermo (Mondello – Antico Stabilimento Balneare)
Palermo (Tonnara Florio   Teatro Politeama Garibaldi) 
Palermo (Villa Niscemi) 
Episode summary
At the beginning of this leg, teams were instructed to fly to Palermo on the Italian island of Sicily. Once there, teams found a series of tambourines marked with one of three departure times the next morning at the Teatro di Verdura.
 In this leg's Roadblock, one team member had to drive a go-kart along the old route of the Targa Florio around Mount Pellegrino within 4:07 minutes in order to receive their next clue from Nino Vaccarella. If unsuccessful, they had to follow a pace car back to the starting line and try again. Once racers got their next clue, they were driven back down the mountain to reunite with their partner at Antico Stabilimento Balneare.
 This leg's Detour was a choice between Painters or Posers. In Painters, teams had to travel to the Tonnara Florio and restore a fresco while lying on their backs on a high scaffolding to the satisfaction of the restoration artist before receiving their next clue. In Posers, teams had to travel to the Teatro Politeama Garibaldi and watch a series of opera performers. They then had to go backstage, identify the costumes worn by the performers, and write down the characters' names and their operas in the order the performers appeared on stage by writing the answers in a playbook in order to receive their next clue.
Teams had to check in at the pit stop: Villa Niscemi.
Additional notes
Phil Keoghan announced that this was The Amazing Races 300th leg when Misti & Jim checked in first at the pit stop.
Palermo mayor Leoluca Orlando appeared as the pit stop greeter outside the mayoral headquarters at Villa Niscemi.
This was a non-elimination leg.

Leg 8 (Italy → Malta)

Episode 8: "Hot Sexy Knights" (November 21, 2014)
Prize:  for each team member (awarded to Adam & Bethany)
Eliminated: Tim & Te Jay
Locations
Palermo (Villa Niscemi) 
 Pozzallo → Valletta, Malta
Valletta (Bridge Bar → Upper Barrakka Gardens)
Qrendi (Żurrieq Valley Sea Inlet – Boathouse)
Qrendi (Blue Grotto) 
Birgu (Church of St. Scholastica – Triq Antika)
Birgu (Saint Lawrence's Church Oratory) 
Birgu (Birgu Harbour  Gate of Provence) 
Gżira (Manoel Island – Fort Manoel) 
Episode summary
At the beginning of this leg, teams were instructed to travel by ferry to Valletta, Malta. Once there, teams were given a drink order from the bartender at the Bridge Bar and had to carry the order on a tray up Saint Ursula Street's staircase to a group of the Knights of Malta at the Upper Barrakka Gardens in order to receive their next clue. If either teammate dropped anything from their tray along the way, they had to clean up the mess before the bartender replaced their broken items. Teams were then directed to the boathouse at the Żurrieq Valley Sea Inlet, where they found a series of Maltese cross necklaces with departure times the next morning.
 In this leg's Roadblock, one team member had to rappel twenty stories down into the Blue Grotto and, once in the water, swim into the cave in order to pick up their next clue. They then rejoined their partner in a waiting boat and were taken ashore.
After completing the Roadblock, teams had to make their way to the Church of St. Scholastica in Birgu, where they found their next clue.
 For their Speed Bump, Tim & Te Jay had to travel to the oratory of Saint Lawrence's Church and paint the Maltese cross onto two shields before they could continue racing.
 This season's first Blind Detour, where teams only learned about the task they chose once they arrived at its location, was a choice between Flag or Shine. In Flag, teams headed to the Birgu Harbour and had to participate in a traditional Maltese game of ġostra, which involved running up a greased log over the harbor to grab flags in order to receive their next clue. In Shine, teams went to the Gate of Provence, where they had to retrieve a helmet and chest plate from a wall. Team members had to put on the armor pieces and polish each other's armor to the satisfaction of the knights in order to receive their next clue. 
Teams had to check in at the pit stop: Fort Manoel on Manoel Island.
Additional notes
Adam & Bethany used their Express Pass to bypass the Detour on this leg.

Leg 9 (Malta → Singapore)

Episode 9: "You're Taking My Tan Off" (November 28, 2014)
Prize: A trip for two to Bali, Indonesia (awarded to Adam & Bethany)
Eliminated: Kym & Alli
Locations
Valletta (City Gate) 
 Valletta → Singapore
 Singapore (Changi Village & Pulau Ubin – Coconut Stand)
Singapore (Sentosa – Wave House) 
Singapore (Marina Bay Sands) 
Singapore (Raffles Place – Centre Square)
Singapore (Hong San See Temple  Robertson Quay – Red House) 
Singapore (Fort Canning Park) 
Singapore (Mount Faber – Merlion Statue)
Singapore (The Fullerton Pavilion) 
Episode summary
At the beginning of this leg, teams were instructed to fly to Singapore. Teams were given tickets on a prearranged flight to Paris, France, and had to either book a connecting flight to Singapore from Paris or book an alternative flight from Malta. Once in Singapore, teams took a bumboat to Pulau Ubin, where they had to find a coconut stand and drink the coconut water before receiving their next clue.
 For this season's only Fast Forward, teams had to surf on an artificially-generated wave at Sentosa's Wave House for two minutes without falling. Adam & Bethany won the Fast Forward.
After completing the Roadblock, teams had to make their way to Centre Square at Raffles Place, where they had to find a man wearing a red-and-yellow "Onward Singapore" placard on his back, which was their next clue.
 This leg's Detour was a choice between China Cups or Chili Crabs. In China Cups, teams traveled to the Hong San See temple, where they had to undergo a cupping therapy session, after which, they received their next clue. In Chili Crabs, teams traveled to the Red House seafood restaurant, where they had to prepare chilli crab by cracking open crab claws smothered in hot chili sauce. They had to collect  of crab meat in order to receive their next clue.
After completing the Detour, teams made their way to Fort Canning Park. There, they were instructed to find their next clue at one of the five official Merlion monuments throughout the city – two at Merlion Park, and one each at Sentosa, Tourism Court, and Mount Faber – the latter of which was the correct site.
Teams had to check in at the pit stop: The Fullerton Pavilion, overlooking Marina Bay.
Additional notes
 Amy & Maya chose to use the U-Turn on Adam & Bethany. However, Adam & Bethany had won the Fast Forward and were therefore unaffected.
Melody Chen from The Amazing Race Asia 1 was the pit stop greeter on this leg.

Leg 10 (Singapore → Philippines)

Episode 10: "Smells Like Dirty Tube Socks" (December 5, 2014)
Prize: A trip for two to Ninh Vân, Vietnam (awarded to Misti & Jim)
Locations
Singapore (The Fullerton Pavilion) 
 Singapore → Manila, Philippines
 Parañaque (Baclaran Church) → Rosario (Rosario Municipal Plaza – Salinas Specials)
Rosario (Manila Bay – Rosario Fish Port  RGC Side Car and Welding Shop) 
Naic (Sitio Maname – Rice Fields) 
Episode summary
At the beginning of this leg, teams were instructed to fly to Manila, Philippines. Once in Manila, teams had to pick up their clue from the flea market's flower vendor at Baclaran Church the next morning. This clue instructed teams to then travel by jeepney to Salinas Specials at Rosario Municipal Plaza, where they found their next clue.
 This leg's Detour was a choice between Catch or Coach. In Catch, teams had to wade into Manila Bay to a pump boat offshore. In Coach, teams had to properly assemble and attach a side car onto a motorcycle using the provided tools, making sure to match the motorcycle to their provided side car, in order to receive their next clue.
After completing the Detour, teams had to travel to the rice fields in Naic, where they took part in a Switchback of the infamous ox-plow task from season 5. Teams had to use a plow attached to an water buffalo to dredge the rice paddy in order to find their next clue hidden somewhere in the mud. The clue buried in the mud directed teams to search on foot for the nearby pit stop.
Additional notes 
This was a non-elimination leg.

Leg 11 (Philippines)

Episode 11: "Hooping It Up" (December 12, 2014)
Locations
Bacoor (Molino Boulevard) 
 Bacoor (Molino Boulevard) to Manila (Rajah Sulayman Park)
Manila (Manila Baywalk) 
Manila (Malate Neighborhood) 
Manila (Divisoria Market) 
Manila (Intramuros – Baluarte de San Diego) 
Episode summary
At the beginning of this leg, teams had to travel by jeepney to Rajah Sulayman Park in Manila, where they found their next clue.
 For their Speed Bump, Brooke & Robbie had to unload the items from a man's broken padyak and load them onto a second padyak before they could continue racing.
 This season's final Detour was also a Blind Detour and was a choice between This or That. In This, teams traveled on foot to the intersection of Bocobo and Malvar Streets, where they had to play street basketball against a neighborhood team and score 21 points in order to receive their next clue. In That, teams traveled on foot to the intersection of Pedro Gil Street and Pilar Hidalgo Lim, where they had to race padyaks around a marked course for four laps with each teammate pedaling the bicycle for two laps each. If teams finished four laps of the course within 17:55 minutes, they could receive their next clue.
 In this leg's Roadblock, one team member had to deliver specified quantities of two coconut-based products – bunot (a coconut shell used to clean floors) and walis tingting (a broom made of palm fronds) – to three different addresses within the Divisoria Market, collect a receipt from each delivery, and then return all three receipts in order to receive their next clue.
Teams had to check in at the pit stop: the Baluarte de San Diego in Intramuros.
Additional notes
There was no elimination at the end of this leg; all teams were instead instructed to continue racing.

Leg 12 (Philippines → United States)

Episode 12: "All or Nothing" (December 19, 2014)
Winners: Amy & Maya
Second Place: Misti & Jim
Third Place: Adam & Bethany
Eliminated (at the episode's midpoint): Brooke & Robbie
Locations
 Manila → Los Angeles, California
Los Angeles (Los Angeles International Airport)
Los Angeles (Downtown City Hall)
San Pedro (Terminal Island – Southwest Marine Warehouse)  (Elimination Point)
San Pedro (Terminal Island – United States Coast Guard Base)
Wilmington (ConGlobal Industries) 
Rancho Palos Verdes (Point Vicente Lighthouse) 
Episode summary
At the beginning of this leg, Phil Keoghan gave teams a manila envelope along with their clue, which instructed them to travel to the "City of Angels": Los Angeles. At the Los Angeles International Airport, teams had to find a marked vehicle and use its voice control feature to listen to their next clue, which directed them to drive to Los Angeles City Hall. There, teams met the city's film clerk, who stamped the filming permit in their manila envelope and directed them to the Southwest Marine Warehouse, where they had to hand the permit to an assistant director in exchange for their next clue.
 In this leg's first Roadblock, one team member had to learn how to jump out of a third story window from a stunt coordinator. When ready, they had to pick up a satchel, jump through a window made of breakaway glass, and land safely on a pile of boxes below. Once completed, they could retrieve their next clue inside their satchel. Brooke & Robbie were the last team to arrive at this midpoint and were eliminated before being allowed to complete the Roadblock.
After completing the first Roadblock, teams had to travel to the United States Coast Guard Base at Terminal Island, where they participated in a search-and-rescue exercise with the Coast Guard. After a response boat took them out into the ocean, teams had to swim to a crash test dummy, set off a safety smoke bomb, and swim with the dummy back to the boat in order to receive their next clue.
 In this season's final Roadblock, the team member who did not perform the previous Roadblock had to search amongst 15,000 shipping containers to find nine with the names of the cities they visited during the race and remember a color-coded digit on each container. Without using notes, they then had to write the numbers down on a requisition form in the order that they visited the cities so as to receive their final clue, which directed teams to the finish line: Point Vicente Lighthouse in Rancho Palos Verdes.
{| class="wikitable unsortable" style="text-align:center;"
|-
! scope="col" rowspan=2|City
! scope="col" colspan=3|Numbers
|-
!style="background:blue;"| 
!style="background:orange;"| Misti
!style="background:lime;"| Bethany
|-
! scope="row" | Saint Thomas
|8
|2
|3
|-
! scope="row" | London
|1
|5
|6
|-
! scope="row" | Lerwick
|7
|1
|8
|-
! scope="row" | Copenhagen
|6
|0
|1
|-
! scope="row" | Marrakesh
|5
|9
|6
|-
! scope="row" | Palermo
|1
|5
|0
|-
! scope="row" | Valletta
|4
|8
|9
|-
! scope="row" | Singapore
|9
|2
|3
|-
! scope="row" | Manila
|8
|3
|4
|}

Reception

Critical response
The Amazing Race 25 received positive reviews. Jodi Walker of Entertainment Weekly called this season a "good underdog story". Daniel Fienberg of HitFix was critical of some structural decisions but was positive towards this season overall. Alex Morella of "Survivor Oz" said "Well…it started really well…went bland in the middle for a bit…but finished strongly! I enjoyed this season and The Amazing Race put out a good product for its Silver Anniversary! I enjoyed the teams…quite a few of the challenges (although several better detours are needed in some legs…and no Morocco!)" In 2016, this season was ranked 7th out of the first 27 seasons by the Rob Has a Podcast Amazing Race correspondents.

Ratings
U.S. Nielsen ratings

U.S. DVR Ratings

Canadian ratings
Canadian broadcaster CTV also airs The Amazing Race on Fridays. Episodes air at 8:00 p.m. Eastern and Central (9:00 p.m. Pacific, Mountain and Atlantic).

Canadian DVR ratings are included in Numeris' count.

References

External links

 25
2014 American television seasons
Television shows filmed in New York City
Television shows filmed in the United States Virgin Islands
Television shows filmed in England
Television shows filmed in Scotland
Television shows filmed in Sweden
Television shows filmed in Denmark
Television shows filmed in Morocco
Television shows filmed in Italy
Television shows filmed in Malta
Television shows filmed in Singapore
Television shows filmed in the Philippines
Television shows filmed in Japan
Television shows filmed in California